Daniele Orsato (born 23 November 1975) is an Italian football referee.

Career
Orsato became a FIFA referee in 2010. He has served as a referee in qualifying matches for the 2014 World Cup and Euro 2012.

Orsato refereed group stage matches in the 2012–13, 2013–14, and 2014–15 UEFA Champions League competitions.

In 2016, Orsato refereed the round of 16 match between PSV Eindhoven and Atlético Madrid in the 2015–16 UEFA Champions League.

On 14 March 2017, Orsato refereed the round of 16 match between Leicester City and Sevilla in the 2016–17 UEFA Champions League.

On 1 July 2018, Orsato was appointed a VAR referee for the 2018 FIFA World Cup match between Croatia and Denmark.

On 12 February 2019, Orsato refereed the round of 16 first leg matches between Manchester United and PSG in the UEFA Champions League. He gave out 10 yellow cards (6 for Manchester United and 4 for PSG) and sent off Paul Pogba in the 89th minute.

Orsato refereed the 2020 UEFA Champions League Final between Paris Saint-Germain and Bayern Munich.

He also refereed the second leg of the 2021 UEFA Champions League semi-final between Chelsea and Real Madrid.

In 2020, Orsato was awarded by IFFHS as the best referee of that calendar year.

On 20 November 2022, Orsato was appointed as the referee for the opening match of the 2022 FIFA World Cup between hosts Qatar and Ecuador.

References

External links 
 

1975 births
Living people
Sportspeople from Vicenza
Italian football referees
UEFA Champions League referees
2018 FIFA World Cup referees
UEFA Euro 2020 referees
2022 FIFA World Cup referees
FIFA World Cup referees